Ernesto Rossi may refer to:

 Ernesto Rossi (actor) (1827–1896), Italian actor
 Ernesto Rossi (politician) (1897–1967), Italian politician and anti-fascist activist
 Ernesto Rossi (gangster) (1903–1931), Italian-American gangster